Consulado metro station is a transfer station of the Mexico City Metro in Gustavo A. Madero and Venustiano Carranza, Mexico City. It is a combined elevated and at-grade station, along Lines 4 (the Aqua Line) and 5 (the Yellow Line). Consulado is located between Bondojito and Canal del Norte stations on Line 4, and between Valle Gómez and Eduardo Molina stations on Line 5. It serves the colonias of 7 de Noviembre, 20 de Noviembre, Felipe Ángeles, and Mártires de Río Blanco. 

The station is named after the Consulado River, which runs below Río Consulado Avenue, and its pictogram depicts a water duct, representing the ducted part of the river. Consulado station opened on 29 August 1981 with service northward toward Martín Carrera station and southward toward Candelaria station on Line 4. Southeast service on Line 5 toward Pantitlán metro station started on 19 December 1981. In 2019, the station had an overall average daily ridership of 9,337 passengers, making it one of the least-used stations in the network.

Location

Consulado is a metro transfer station in the limits of Gustavo A. Madero and Venustiano Carranza boroughs, in northeastern Mexico City. The station lies on Río Consulado Avenue and Congreso de la Unión Avenue, and serves colonias (Mexican Spanish for "neighborhoods") of 7 de Noviembre and Mártires de Río Blanco, in Gustavo A. Madero, and of 20 de Noviembre and Felipe Ángeles, in Venustiano Carranza. Within the system, it lies between Bondojito and Canal del Norte metro stations on Line 4; on Line 5, between Valle Gómez and Eduardo Molina metro stations. The area is serviced by Line 5 of the Metrobús system at Río Consulado bus station, a few blocks away; by Routes 5-A, 20-A, and 20-B of the city's public bus system and by Routes 37 and 200 of the Red de Transporte de Pasajeros network.

Exits
There are four exits:
East: Congreso de la Unión Avenue and Oriente 87 Street, 20 de Noviembre (Line 4).
West: Congreso de la Unión Avenue and Oriente 85 Street, Mártires de Río Blanco (Line 4).
North: Río Consulado Avenue and Norte 64-A Street, 7 de Noviembre (Line 5).
South: Río Consulado Avenue and Cuarzo Street, Felipe Ángeles (Line 5).

History and construction

Line 4 of the Mexico City Metro was built by Cometro, a subsidiary of Empresas ICA; Consulado Line 4 opened on 29 August 1981, on the first day of the then Martín Carrera–Candelaria service.

Line 5 was built by Empresas ICA; Consulado Line 5 opened on 19 December 1981, on the first day of the service toward Pantitlán station. Northwestern service toward La Raza station started on 1 July 1982.

The station's pictogram depicts a water duct, representing the ducted part of the Consulado River, which runs under the station. Inside the Line 5 station, there are four cultural showcases.

Incidents
According to the system authorities, the Consulado–Valle Gómez section is a common zone of copper wire thefts, which potentially can create fires in the tracks. On 31 July 2018, three railroad cars uncoupled while a train was traveling at the Consulado–Eduardo Molina interstation, with no injuries reported. When the incident was reviewed, authorities found that the nuts that kept the cars together were damaged. After the collapse of the elevated railway near Olivos station on Line 12 in May 2021, users reported the structural damage to other elevated stations, including Consulado station. Mayor of Mexico City, Claudia Sheinbaum, said that the reports would be examined accordingly.

Ridership
According to the data provided by the authorities since the 2000s, Consulado metro station has been one of the least busy stations of the system's 195 stations. In the last decade, commuters averaged per year between 2,000 and 5,400 daily entrances on Line 4 and between 3,300 and 6,100 daily entrances on Line 5. In 2019, before the impact of the COVID-19 pandemic on public transport, the station's ridership totaled 3,408,299 passengers. For Line 4, the ridership was 1,608,777 passengers (4,407 per day), which was a decrease of 15,947 passengers compared to 2018. For Line 5, the station had a ridership of 1,799,522 passengers (4,930 per day), which was a decrease of 6,517 passengers compared to 2018.

In 2019, the Line 4 station was the 190th busiest of the system and the line's second least used. The Line 5 station was the 187th busiest in the system and the line's third-least used.

Notes

References

External links

1981 establishments in Mexico
Mexico City Metro Line 4 stations
Mexico City Metro Line 5 stations
Mexico City Metro stations in Gustavo A. Madero, Mexico City
Mexico City Metro stations in Venustiano Carranza, Mexico City
Railway stations opened in 1981